Coppin State University (Coppin) is a public historically black university in Baltimore, Maryland. It is part of the University System of Maryland and a member of the Thurgood Marshall College Fund.

History
Coppin State University was founded in 1900 at what was then called Colored High School (later named Douglass High School) on Pennsylvania Avenue by the Baltimore City School Board. It first had a one-year training course for the preparation of African-American elementary school teachers. By 1902, the training program was expanded to a two-year Normal Department within the high school. Seven years later it was separated from the high school and given its own principal.

In 1926, this facility for teacher training was named Fanny Jackson Coppin Normal School in honor of an African-American woman who was a pioneer in teacher education, Fanny Jackson Coppin.

By 1938 the curriculum of the normal school was lengthened to four years, authority was given for the granting of the Bachelor of Science degree, and the name of the Normal School was changed to Coppin Teachers College. In 1950, Coppin became part of the higher education system of Maryland under the State Department of Education, and renamed Coppin State Teachers College. Two years later Coppin moved to its present  site on West North Avenue.

In acknowledgment of the goals and objectives of the college, the Board of Trustees ruled in 1963 that the institution's degree-granting authority would no longer be restricted to teacher education. Following this ruling, Coppin was officially renamed Coppin State College, and in 1967 the first Bachelor of Arts degree was conferred. In 1988, the College became part of the newly organized University of Maryland System (now the University System of Maryland.) The school was officially renamed Coppin State University on April 13, 2004.

Coppin's first president (1930–1956) was Dr. Miles Connor. He was succeeded by Dr. Parlett Moore in 1956, who served until Dr. Calvin W. Burnett took over as Coppin's third president in 1970. Burnett served the institution for thirty-three years, until Coppin's fourth president, Dr. Stanley F. Battle, was appointed on March 3, 2003. After Dr. Battle departed for North Carolina A&T State University in 2007, Coppin's fifth president, Dr. Reginald Avery was hired. Avery announced his resignation (effective January 22, 2013). Dr. Mortimer H. Neufville became the university's sixth president Jan 23 after Avery stepped down. Dr. Maria Thompson became the university's seventh and first woman president, July 1, 2015. Following her retirement in June 2019, Dr. Mickey L. Burnim was appointed Interim President until May 2020. Dr. Anthony L. Jenkins was appointed Coppin State University's eighth president on May 26, 2020.

Academics
Coppin State University is classified among "Master's Colleges & Universities: Small Programs" and institutionally accredited by the Middle States Commission on Higher Education. Specific programs are accredited by the Commission on Nursing Education (CCNE), the Council on Rehabilitation Education (CORE), the Council for the Accreditation of Counseling and Related Educational Programs (CACREP), the Council on Social Work Education (CSWE), and the Commission on Accreditation of Health Informatics and Information Management Education (CAHIIM). Additionally, the Accreditation Council for Business Schools and Programs (ACBSP) accredits the College of Business.

CSU offers undergraduate and graduate degree and certificate programs through the following colleges:
College of Arts & Sciences, and Education
College of Behavioral & Social Sciences
College of Business
College of Health Professions

Coppin has offered a selective honors program since 1981 for high-performing undergraduate students. The honors program students live on the same floor in the Daley building, and are recipients of one or more scholarships.

Student activities
There are over 30 student organizations on campus.

Athletics

The Coppin State Eagles compete in the Mid-Eastern Athletic Conference and in the NCAA Division I. The school has men's teams in baseball, basketball, cross country, tennis and both track, and women's teams in basketball, bowling, cross country, softball, tennis, indoor and outdoor track and field and volleyball.

In 1997, the Coppin State Men's Basketball team defeated the University of South Carolina in the opening round of the NCAA Men's Division I Basketball Championship becoming just the third #15 seed to defeat a #2 seed. In the 2007–08 season, Coppin State became the first team in NCAA College Basketball history to reach the NCAA Tournament with 20 losses.

Under the direction of Coach Leon Stewart, Coppin State began breaking school records in bowling, which is one of its newer teams.  In 2012, the Eagles signed two premier women bowlers in Kache Woods and Kristen Sharpe. The 2013 recruiting class included Woods and Sharpe, along with Erica Washington, Loren Johnson, and Heather Josker. With this influx of talent, the 2013 Eagles broke the school record for most wins.  The Eagles upped that performance in 2014 once again as they set a Coppin State record for wins in a season.

Greek life
Coppin State actively has all nine National Pan-Hellenic Council (NPHC) organizations present on campus. The following is a collective list of all the chapters chartered at the university.

Fraternities

Sororities

Notable alumni

References

External links

Coppin State Athletics website

 
Historically black universities and colleges in the United States
Mondawmin, Baltimore
Universities and colleges in Baltimore
Educational institutions established in 1900
1900 establishments in Maryland
Public universities and colleges in Maryland
University System of Maryland campuses